Pergularia is a genus of the botanical family Apocynaceae. Pergularia daemia is a perennial twinning herb that grows along the roadsides of India and  tropical and subtropical regions in South Asia, Africa, and Australia.

Pharmacological activities include antiinflammatory, hepatoprotective, anticancer, antidiabetic, antioxidant, antibacterial, antifungal, analgesic, anti-infertility and central nervous system depressant activity.

Species

formerly included
Moved to other genera – Cionura, Marsdenia, Metaplexis, Strophanthus, Telosma, Vincetoxicum (syn. Tylophora), Vallaris

References

External links

Apocynaceae genera
Medicinal plants
Asclepiadoideae